The Take Action Tour is an annual spring tour that not only hosts several bands, but also tries to get people alerted about the issues with teen suicide, and ultimately tries to prevent it. The tour was created by both Sub City and Hopeless Records. A portion of the ticket sales and compilation CD sales are donated to the cause.

In recent years, the tour has chosen bands that have fans more of the demographic age group.

In 2011, Sub City Records announced a new beneficiary Sex, Etc., a nonprofit organization dedicated to raising teen awareness of sexually transmitted diseases and the benefits of safe sex.

Tours By Year
2002
Jimmy Eat World
The International Noise Conspiracy
Poison the Well
The Bouncing Souls
Anti-Flag
Thursday
The Promise Ring
Common Rider
Lawrence Arms
Snapcase
Cursive
Coheed And Cambria
Wau Wau Sisters
Le Tigre
Northern State

2003
Poison The Well
Dillinger Escape Plan
Further Seems Forever
Eighteen Visions
Shai Hulud
Since By Man
Avenged Sevenfold
This Day Forward
Shadows Fall
Throwdown
Himsa
These Arms Are Snakes

2005
Sugarcult
Hawthorne Heights
Hopesfall
The Early November (select shows)
Maxeen (select shows)
Mêlée (select shows)
Plain White T's  (select shows)
Anberlin (select shows)
Gym Class Heroes (one show only)
Don't Look Down (one show only)

2006
Matchbook Romance
Amber Pacific
The Early November
Silverstein (select shows)
Chiodos (select shows)
Paramore (select shows)
Man Alive (select shows)
I Am Ghost (select shows)
We Are the Fury (select shows)
Hit the Lights (select shows)
Roses are Red (select shows)
Sullivan

2007
The Red Jumpsuit Apparatus
Emery
Scary Kids Scaring Kids
A Static Lullaby
Kaddisfly

2008
Every Time I Die
From First To Last
The Bled
August Burns Red
The Human Abstract

2009
Cute Is What We Aim For
Meg & Dia
Breathe Carolina
Every Avenue
Anarbor
All Time Low
Set Your Goals
Stealing O'Neal

2010
We The Kings
Mayday Parade
There For Tomorrow
A Rocket To The Moon
Stereo Skyline
Call The Cops
Attack Attack!
Pierce The Veil
Dream On, Dreamer

2011
Silverstein
Bayside
Polar Bear Club
The Swellers
Texas in July

2013
The Used
We Came As Romans
Crown the Empire
Mindflow

2014
The Devil Wears Prada
The Ghost Inside
I Killed the Prom Queen
Dangerkids

2015
Memphis May Fire
Crown the Empire
Dance Gavin Dance
Palisades

Compilation CDs
 Take Action! Vol. 1
 Take Action! Vol. 2
 Take Action! Vol. 3
 Take Action! Vol. 4
 Take Action! Vol. 5
 Take Action! Vol. 6
 Take Action! Vol. 7
 Take Action! Vol. 8
 Take Action! Vol. 9
 Take Action! Vol. 10
 Take Action! Vol. 11

References

Music festivals in the United States
Concert tours